Adrian Edmund Gill FRS (22 February 1937 – 19 April 1986) was an Australian meteorologist and oceanographer best known for his textbook Atmosphere-Ocean Dynamics. Gill was born in Melbourne Australia and worked at Cambridge, serving as Senior Research Fellow from 1963 to 1984. His father was Edmund Gill, geologist, palaeontologist and curator at the National Museum of Victoria.

Gill was chair of the Tropical Ocean Global Atmosphere program. He was elected a Fellow of the Royal Society of London in 1986. His candidacy citation read: "Dr A. E. Gill is internationally recognised for his work in geophysical fluid dynamics and leads a small but highly productive team working on problems in dynamical oceanography and meteorology. He has made outstanding theoretical contributions to a wide range of topics, including the stability of pipe flow, thermal convection, circulation of the Southern Ocean, seasonal variability of the ocean, waves in rotating fluids, wind-induced upwelling, coastal currents and sea-level changes and coastally-trapped waves in the atmosphere, and he is particularly effective in the way he is able to interpret observations and guide the activities of observational workers".

Honours 
 Individual Merit Senior Principal Scientific Officer of the Meteorological Office.
 Florida State University has a professorship endowned in his honor.
 The Royal Meteorological Society annually awards an "Adrian Gill Award" to a member of the Society who has made a significant contribution in [fields] that interface between atmospheric science and... oceanography, hydrology, geochemistry and numerical methodologies.

Selected publications
 
 
 
 
 
 
 
 
 
 
 
 
 
 
 
  1983

References

1937 births
1986 deaths
Fluid dynamicists
Australian meteorologists
Meteorologists from Melbourne
Australian oceanographers
Fellows of the Royal Society
Australian textbook writers